Utovlje is a village northeast of Križ in the Municipality of Sežana in the Littoral region of Slovenia.

Church

The local church is dedicated to Saint Justus and belongs to the Parish of Tomaj.

References

External links

Utovlje on Geopedia

Populated places in the Municipality of Sežana